George Renwick (October 31, 1789June 1863) was a Michigan politician.

Early life
Renwick was born in England on October 31, 1789. In 1802, Renwick immigrated with his father's family to the United States, where they settled in Gorham, New York. Renwick attended school in Canandaigua, New York, and taught school in the winter. Renwick worked as a carpenter and a farmer in his early life. In 1817, Renwick moved to Greece, New York. In 1828, Renwick moved to Salem, Michigan.

Career
Renwick served on the Michigan Territorial Council, where he represented the 4th district from May 1, 1832 to August 25, 1835. On November 5, 1838, Renwick was elected to the Michigan House of Representatives where he represented the Washtenaw County district from January 7, 1839 to April 13, 1841. On November 2, 1840, Renwick was again elected to the state house, where he represented the same district from January 4, 1847 to March 17, 1847.

Death
Renwick died in the June of 1863.

References

1789 births
1863 deaths
Farmers from New York (state)
English emigrants to the United States
People from Gorham, New York
People from Greece, New York
People from Washtenaw County, Michigan
Members of the Michigan Territorial Legislature
Members of the Michigan House of Representatives
Michigan Whigs
19th-century American politicians